Exhibit A was an art exhibition in the galleries of the Serpentine Gallery, London, from May 7—June 7, 1992.

Theme and content
The eight artists whose work was showcased were selected by curator Henry Bond for their ongoing interest in the exhibition's key theme: art exploring perceptions of evidential fact particularly in the context of the crime scene. The art historian Ian Jeffrey wrote,It is the opposite, Exhibit A, to a sensational exhibition, and crystallises a turning in the art world away from the egotistical mode towards impersonality. The egotistical, it admits, is a delusion ... its premises are anonymous, fluent, vertiginous, wary of values. Anything else would emerge as a cliché ... it is, in fact, a properly phenomenological exhibition, one which refuses to differentiate between subject and object, between perception and the moments and occasions of perception.  One of the works on view was a slide-installation, shown in a darkened room, by artist Mat Collishaw, which presented the viewer with a rapid-fire sequence of stills of Jodie Foster dancing as she appeared in the "rape scene", in Jonathan Kaplan's 1988 movie The Accused.

Exhibited artists

Mat Collishaw
Catherine Yass
Cesare Pietroiusti 
Dominique Gonzalez-Foerster
Damien Hirst
Sam Samore
Hirsch Perlman
Cindy Bernard

References

Review literature

 Sarah Kent, “Exhibit A,” Time Out, London, No. 1135.
 Charles Hall, “Exhibit A,” Arts Review, June 1992.
 Kate Bush, “Exhibit A,” Art Monthly, June 1992, p. 15-16.

External links
 Exhibition catalogue (Baltic Mill archive)
Serpentine Gallery, London

Art exhibitions in London
Damien Hirst
Forensic science in popular culture
1992 in art
1992 in London
Hyde Park, London